Mindat may refer to:

Places
Mindat District, a district in Chin State, Myanmar (Burma), consisting of two townships and many villages
Mindat Township, Myanmar
Mindat, Chin State, a town in Chin State, Myanmar, administrative seat of Mindat Township

Other uses
 Mindat, alternative name for the Kʼchò language in Myanmar
Mindat Min, a Burmese prince
Mindat.org, an online mineralogy database